Thunder in the Night is a 1935 American crime film directed by George Archainbaud and written by Frances Hyland and Eugene Solow. It is based on the 1934 play A Woman Lies by Ladislas Fodor. The film stars Edmund Lowe, Karen Morley, Paul Cavanagh, Una O'Connor, Gene Lockhart and John Qualen. The film was released on September 20, 1935, by 20th Century Fox.

Plot
Torok, a police captain in Budapest, is pleased when his friend, Count Peter Alvinczy, is elected to the presidency of the government's cabinet. Alvinczy is married to Madalaine, whose first husband, Paul Szegedy, long believed to be dead, turns up and threatens to publicly embarrass Alvinczy by revealing his wife to be already married.

Szegedy's mistress and partner in a theatrical act, Katherine Szabo, tries in vain to change his mind, even telling Torok at the police precinct what is occurring. He goes through with the scheme to blackmail Madalaine and is soon found dead by Torok, shot through the heart on the street.

Madelaine becomes the prime suspect in Torok's investigation and is placed under arrest. Her husband confesses to the murder, trying to protect her. Torok, however, deduces that Katherine, a sharpshooter in their performing act, picked up a gun in the police station when no one was looking and, through a window, shot her lover. Found out, Katherine kills herself. Torok then releases Madalaine, promising to keep her secret and protect his friend.

Cast 
Edmund Lowe as Captain Karl Torok
Karen Morley as Madalaine
Paul Cavanagh as Count Peter Alvinczy
Una O'Connor as Julie
Gene Lockhart as Gabor
John Qualen as Porter
Russell Hicks as Prefect of Police
Arthur Edmund Carewe as Professor Omega
Bodil Rosing as Lisa
Gloria Roy as Katherine Szabo
Cornelius Keefe as Paul Szeged
Polly Ann Young as Torok's Date
Herman Bing as Taxi Driver
Luis Alberni as Taxi Driver 
Landers Stevens as Hans

References

External links
 

1935 films
American crime films
1935 crime films
Fox Film films
20th Century Fox films
Films directed by George Archainbaud
American black-and-white films
Films set in Hungary
American films based on plays
Films scored by Samuel Kaylin
1930s English-language films
1930s American films